The 1950 Little League World Series was held from August 23 to August 26 in Williamsport, Pennsylvania. The Houston Little League of Houston, Texas, defeated Bridgeport Little League of Bridgeport, Connecticut, in the championship game of the 4th Little League World Series.

Attendees at the championship game included James H. Duff, Governor of Pennsylvania, and Ford Frick, president of the National League (and later Commissioner of Baseball). The Houston Little League team was managed by former MLB player Jeff Cross.

Teams

Bracket

References

External links
 1950 Tournament Bracket via Wayback Machine
 1950 Line Scores via Wayback Machine

Little League World Series
Little League World Series
Little League World Series